Henry VIII of England had several children. The best known children are the three legitimate offspring who survived infancy and would succeed him as monarchs of England successively, Edward VI, Mary I and Elizabeth I.

His first two wives, Catherine of Aragon and Anne Boleyn, had several pregnancies that ended in stillbirth, miscarriage, or death in infancy. Henry acknowledged one illegitimate child, Henry FitzRoy, as his own, but is suspected to have fathered several illegitimate children by different mistresses. The number and identity of these is a matter of historical debate.

There are many theories about whether Henry VIII had fertility difficulties. His last three wives, Anne of Cleves, Catherine Howard and Catherine Parr are not known to have conceived by him, although Parr conceived in her next marriage.

None of Henry's acknowledged children (legitimate or otherwise) had children of their own, leaving him with no direct descendants after the death of Elizabeth in 1603.

Legitimate children

Illegitimate children 
Henry VIII of England had one acknowledged illegitimate child, as well as several others who are suspected to be his, by his mistresses.

Henry VIII acknowledged Henry Fitzroy (15 June 1519 – 23 July 1536), the son of his mistress Elizabeth Blount, and granted him a dukedom; Fitzroy married Lady Mary Howard, but had no issue.

Others speculated to have been Henry VIII's illegitimate offspring include:
 Thomas Stukeley (c. 1520 – 4 August 1578), his mother being Jane Pollard, the wife of Sir Hugh Stukeley
 Richard Edwardes (1523? – 1566), born to Mrs. Agnes Edwardes
 Catherine Carey (c. 1524 – 15 January 1569), daughter of his mistress Mary Boleyn, the sister of his second wife, Anne Boleyn, and wife of William Carey.
 Henry Carey (4 March 1526 – 23 July 1596), brother of Catherine Carey
 Ethelreda Malte (born c. 1527 – c. January 1559), born to Joan Dingley, alias Dobson. Paternity was claimed by John Malte.
 John Perrot (November 1528 – 3 November 1592), his mother being Mary Berkeley the wife of Sir Thomas Perrot

See also
 Wives of Henry VIII
 Mistresses of Henry VIII
 :Category:Lists of children by person

References

Further reading
 The Lady Penelope: The Lost Tale of Love and Politics in the Court of Elizabeth I by Sally Varlow (Andre Deutsch 2007 )
 The Children of Henry VIII by John Guy (Oxford UP, 2013 )
 Children of England: The Heirs of King Henry VIII 1547–1558 by Alison Weir (Jonathan Cape, 1996; Vintage, 2008 )
 
 
 
 
 

House of Tudor
17th-century English people